Burgães is a former civil parish in the municipality of Santo Tirso, Portugal. In 2013, the parish merged into the new parish Santo Tirso, Couto (Santa Cristina e São Miguel) e Burgães. It is located northeast in the city of Santo Tirso. Population 2,244 (2001 Census), its area was 5.06 km².

It has several industrial facilities.

References

Former parishes of Santo Tirso